German submarine U-309 was a Type VIIC U-boat of the German Navy (Kriegsmarine) during World War II. The submarine was laid down on 24 January 1942 at the Flender Werke yard at Lübeck, launched on 5 December 1942, and commissioned on 27 January 1943 under the command of Oberleutnant zur See Hans-Gert Mahrholz. She sailed on nine combat patrols, but damaged only one ship, before being sunk off Scotland on 16 February 1945.

Design
German Type VIIC submarines were preceded by the shorter Type VIIB submarines. U-309 had a displacement of  when at the surface and  while submerged. She had two shafts and two  propellers.

U-309 was fitted with five  torpedo tubes (four fitted at the bow and one at the stern), fourteen torpedoes, one  SK C/35 naval gun, 220 rounds, and two twin  C/30 anti-aircraft guns. The boat had a complement of between forty-four and sixty.

Service history

First patrol
After training with the 8th U-boat Flotilla at Königsberg, U-309 was transferred to the 11th U-boat Flotilla based in Bergen on 1 August 1943, Norway, for front-line service. The U-boat departed Kiel on 26 August, arriving at Bergen seven days later, on 1 September. From there she sailed out into the Norwegian Sea on 13 September, and arrived in Trondheim six days later on the 18th. As U-309 was then reassigned to the 9th U-boat Flotilla based at Brest in France. She left Trondheim on 25 September, and sailed out into the mid-Atlantic to patrol, before arriving at Brest on 7 November. During this patrol, on 30 September, U-309 suffered her only casualty, when Mechanikergefreiter Erich Jungmann was lost overboard while working out on deck.

Second patrol
U-309s next patrol took her from Brest, on 19 December 1943, out into the Atlantic west of Ireland, then back to Bordeaux on 14 February 1944. In April 1944 the U-boat was fitted with a Schnorchel underwater-breathing apparatus.

Third to fifth patrols
In June and July 1944 U-309 made two short patrols in the Bay of Biscay, before finally achieving success during her fifth patrol. The U-boat sailed from Brest on 12 July 1944 and into the English Channel. There, at 21:00 on 24 July, she fired three LuT pattern-running torpedoes at Convoy FTM-47, en route from Juno Beach in Normandy to Southend, and hit the 7,219 GRT British Liberty ship Samneva. Badly damaged, the ship was beached at Southampton, but then broke in two and was declared a total loss. U-309 returned to Brest on 3 August.

Sixth and seventh patrols
As the French bases fell to the advancing Allies, U-309 was transferred again, this time to the 33rd U-boat Flotilla based at Flensburg. Under her new commander Oberleutnant zur See Herbert Loeder she left La Pallice on 29 August 1944, and sailed around the British Isles to Stavanger, Norway, arriving on 13 October. The U-boat left there after only two days, sailing to Flensburg by the 21st.  Lothar-Günther Buchheim in 1978 published photos of this patrol in his book U-Boot-Krieg (U-Boat War), a nonfiction story of his trip on U-309 and U-99.  Buchheim also wrote the book Das Boot in 1973, which has some of his experiences on U-309 and U-99.

Eighth and ninth patrols
U-309 left Germany on 30 January 1945, sailing to Horten Naval Base in Norway, arriving there on 2 February. She departed on 8 February, and headed into the waters east of Scotland.

Fate
There, on 16 February 1945, U-309 was shadowing Convoy WN-74 into the Moray Firth when she was detected by the Canadian   with ASDIC (sonar). The first attack on the U-boat produced some oil on the surface. Two further attacks were carried out using the Hedgehog anti-submarine mortar, which produced more oil. The fourth attack using depth charges produced wreckage including charts, signal books and cork insulation material. U-309 sank in position . All 47 aboard were lost.

Wolfpacks
U-309 took part in seven wolfpacks, namely:
 Rossbach (6 – 9 October 1943) 
 Schlieffen (14 – 22 October 1943) 
 Siegfried (22 – 26 October 1943) 
 Rügen 7 (28 December 1943 - 2 January 1944) 
 Rügen 6 (2 – 7 January 1944) 
 Rügen (7 – 26 January 1944) 
 Stürmer (26 January - 3 February 1944)

Discovery
There are no identifying features, but the Type VIIC U-boat is close to the reported position of U-309s sinking, and the damage sustained is consistent with that caused by depth charges.

Summary of raiding history

References

Bibliography

External links

 scapaflow.com: John's U-309/U-1020 Expedition

German Type VIIC submarines
U-boats commissioned in 1943
U-boats sunk in 1945
World War II submarines of Germany
World War II shipwrecks in the North Sea
1942 ships
Ships built in Lübeck
U-boats sunk by depth charges
U-boats sunk by Canadian warships
Ships lost with all hands
Maritime incidents in February 1945